Kishoreganj is a city in Bangladesh. It also may refer to:

 Kishoreganj District, a district in Dhaka Division 
 Kishoreganj Sadar Upazila, eponymous upazila of Kishoreganj District
 Kishoreganj Upazila, an upazila of Nilphamari District